Raymond Gordon "Bunty" Niven (6 March 1910 – 26 November 1992) was an Australian rules footballer who played with Fitzroy and Melbourne in the Victorian Football League (VFL).

Family
His brother, Colin Niven played for Fitzroy and Melbourne, and his nephew, Les Reeves, played for North Melbourne.

Football
He left Fitzroy to play with West Perth in 1932, before returning to Victoria in 1933.

Notes

References

External links 
 
 Ray Niven's playing statistics from WAFL Footy Facts
 Ray Niven's playing statistics from The VFA Project

1910 births
1992 deaths
Australian rules footballers from Victoria (Australia)
Australian Rules footballers: place kick exponents
Fitzroy Football Club players
Melbourne Football Club players
West Perth Football Club players
Brighton Football Club players